Brazil is a 2012 book by Michael Palin published on 11 October 2012. The book accompanies the TV series Brazil with Michael Palin.

Audio edition 
This book is available as an unabridged audiobook, read by Michael Palin and lasting 10 hours, 10 minutes.

References

2012 non-fiction books
British travel books
Books about Brazil
English non-fiction books
Weidenfeld & Nicolson books